Sakıp Sabancı (7 April 1933 – 10 April 2004) was a Turkish business tycoon and philanthropist.

Biography
He was the second son of a cotton trader and worked in his father's business without completing high school. He was the head of Turkey's largest business conglomerate and 147th richest man on the Forbes list of billionaires in 2004.

He took over the family business with assistance from his brothers starting in the 1980s.

The Sabanci Group of Companies operates in eighteen different countries and markets its products internationally.  Currently, Sabancı Holding controls more than 60 companies, in textiles, tourism, automotives, chemicals, tobacco, cement, insurance and banking. The group also has partnerships with the Hilton Group, Bridgestone, Du Pont, Philip Morris, Bekaert, Heidelberg Cement, IBM, BNP Paribas, Dresdner Bank, Carrefour and International Paper. Sabancı Holding and ten other companies within the group are listed on the Istanbul Stock Exchange. In 2011, the consolidated revenue of the company was $13.4 billion. The Sabanci family holds a 60.6% share of the firm.

Sakip Sabanci founded the Sabancı University in 1999. His collections of more than 320 Ottoman and Turkish paintings, statues and more than 400 examples of Ottoman calligraphy are exhibited at Atlı Köşk (The Equestrian Villa) at Bosporus in Emirgan, Istanbul, where he and his family lived for years, and which was converted into the Sakıp Sabancı Museum in 2002.

He died of kidney cancer at the age of 71 and received a state funeral.

Honorary doctorates
Sabancı received honorary doctorates from following Turkish and American universities:
1984 Anadolu University, Eskişehir
1986 University of New Hampshire, New Hampshire, United States
1992 Yıldız Technical University, Istanbul
1993 Erciyes University, Kayseri
1997 Çanakkale Onsekiz Mart University, Çanakkale
 Mimar Sinan Fine Arts University, Istanbul
 Girne American University, Kyrenia, Cyprus
 Trakya University, Edirne
 Istanbul University, Istanbul
1998 Southeastern University, Washington D.C., United States
1999 Çukurova University, Adana
2002 Kırıkkale University, Kırıkkale

Awards
He was awarded by various national and international institutions as listed below:

1979 "Golden Mercury Award" given to successful businessmen.
1987 Belgian "Ordre de Léopold II, Commander Class" by Belgian Prince Albert (now King Albert II of Belgium).
1992 Japanese "Order of the Sacred Treasure, Golden and Silver Star" from the Japanese Government.
1997 Turkish "State Medal of Distinguished Service" by the Turkish President Süleyman Demirel.
1997 "European Chrystal World Award" from the European Institute for Economy in Zurich, Switzerland.
1999 "Businessman of the Year Award" by the FABSIT (Friends of American Board Schools in Turkey) Foundation in New York City, USA.
1999 Turkish "Grand Prize of Culture and Arts" from the Ministry of Culture of the Turkish Republic.
2001 Turkish "Industry Technology and Quality Award" by the GYTE (Gebze Institute for High Technology).
2001 French "Légion d'honneur" from President Jacques Chirac for his contributions to the Franco-Turkish relationships in culture and business.

Books
He wrote books mostly on his experience in business life. Some of them are translated into English and Japanese language. The royalties from his books are being donated to Darülaceze (Almshouse) and Türkiye Spastik Çocuklar Vakfı (Turkey Foundation for Spastic Children).

İşte Hayatım (This is my life), 1985
Para Başarının Mükafatıdır (Money is the reward of success), 1985
This is my life (English) 1988
Gönül Galerimden (From the galleria of my heart), 1988
Rusya'dan Amerika'ya (From Russia to America), 1989
Ücret Pazarlığı mı ? - Koyun Pazarlığı mı ? (Is it wage bargain or sheep bargain ?), 1990
Değişen ve Gelişen Türkiye (Turkey, Changing and Developing), 1991
Daha Fazla İş Daha Fazla Aş (More work, more food), 1993
Doğu Anadolu Raporu (Eastern Anatolian report), 1995
Başarı Şimdi Aslanın Ağzında (Success is now in the lion's mouth), 1998
İşte Hayatım (Japanese), 2000
Hayat Bazen Tatlıdır (Life is sometimes sweet), 2001
Sakıpname (Dedicated to Sakıp), 2002
...bıraktığım yerden Hayatım; (My life from where I left off), 445 pp, .
Her Şeyin Başı Sağlık; (Health first) 176 pp, .

See also
 List of billionaires
 Adile Sultan Palace
 Sakip Sabanci, This is my life, 1985
The Sabanci Group In Brief 
 Official website (English) 
Encyclopædia Britannica, Sakip Sabanci

References

External links
Personal Website
Sakıp Sabancı International Research Awards
Sabancı Group of Companies
Forbes.com: Forbes World's Richest People

1933 births
2004 deaths
People from Talas, Turkey
Sabancı family
Deaths from kidney cancer
Recipients of the Legion of Honour
Turkish art collectors
20th-century Turkish businesspeople
Turkish philanthropists
Burials at Zincirlikuyu Cemetery
Turkish billionaires
Deaths from cancer in Turkey
Museum founders
Recipients of the State Medal of Distinguished Service